Coptops alboirrorata is a species of beetle in the family Cerambycidae. It was described by Ernst Fuchs in 1966. It is known from Vietnam.

References

alboirrorata
Beetles described in 1966